Percy Reginald Lawrence-Grant (30 October 1870 – 19 February 1952) was an English actor known for supporting roles in films such as The Living Ghost, I'll Tell the World, Shanghai Express, The Mask of Fu Manchu and Son of Frankenstein. He was host of the 4th Academy Awards ceremonies in 1931.

Selected filmography 

 The Eternal City (1915) - English Ambassador
 To Hell with the Kaiser! (1918) - The Kaiser / Robert Graubel
 Someone Must Pay (1919) - Walter Hargrave
 Held In Trust (1920) - Dr. Babcock
 The Chorus Girl's Romance (1920) - Jose Brasswine
 Someone in the House (1920) - Walter Hargrave
 Extravagance (1921) - Uncle Mark
 The Great Impersonation (1921) - Emperor William of Germany
 The Dramatic Life of Abraham Lincoln (1924) - Actor at Ford's Theatre
 Happiness (1924) - Mr. Rosselstein
 His Hour (1924) - Stephen Strong
 The Grand Duchess and the Waiter (1926) - The Grand Duke Peter
 The Duchess of Buffalo (1926) - Commandant
 Service for Ladies (1927) - King Boris
 A Gentleman of Paris (1927) - Gen. Baron de Latour
 Serenade (1927) - Josef Bruckner
 Doomsday (1928) - Percival Fream
 Red Hair (1928) - Judge Rufus Lennon
 Something Always Happens (1928) - The Earl of Rochester
 Hold 'Em Yale (1928) - Don Alvarado Montez
 The Woman from Moscow (1928) - The General Stroganoff
 The Case of Lena Smith (1929) - Commissioner
 The Rainbow (1929)
 The Canary Murder Case (1929) - John Cleaver
 Bulldog Drummond (1929) - Dr. Lakington
 The Exalted Flapper (1929) - Premier Vadisco of Dacia
 Is Everybody Happy? (1929) - Victor Molnár
 Safety in Numbers (1930) - Cmmdre. Brinker (uncredited)
 Oh Sailor Behave (1930) - Von Klaus
 The Cat Creeps (1930) - Crosby
 The Boudoir Diplomat (1930) - Ambassador
 Command Performance (1931) - Count Vellenburg
 Forbidden Adventure (1931, also known as Newly Rich) - Equerry
 Their Mad Moment (1931) - Sir Harry Congers
 The Squaw Man (1931) - Gen. Stafford
 Daughter of the Dragon (1931) - Sir Basil Courtney
 The Unholy Garden (1931) - Dr. Shayne
 Shanghai Express (1932) - Reverend Mr. Carmichael
 Man About Town (1932) - Count Vonesse
 Jewel Robbery (1932) - Prof. Bauman (uncredited)
 Speak Easily (1932) - Dr. Bolton
 Divorce in the Family (1932) - Kenny
 Faithless (1932) - Mr. Ledyard
 The Mask of Fu Manchu (1932) - Sir Lionel Barton
 Cavalcade (1933) - Man at Microphone (uncredited)
 The Secret of Madame Blanche (1933) - Commanding Officer (uncredited)
 Clear All Wires! (1933) - MacKenzie
 Looking Forward (1933) - Philip Bendicott
 The Solitaire Man (1933) - Sir Charles Brewster - British Ambassador (uncredited)
 By Candlelight (1933) - Count von Rischenheim
 Queen Christina (1933) - Bit part (uncredited)
 Nana (1934) - Grand Duke Alexis
 Riptide (1934) - Farrington (uncredited)
 I'll Tell the World (1934) - Count Strumsky
 The Count of Monte Cristo (1934) - De Villefort Sr.
 The Painted Veil (1934) - English Governor (scenes deleted)
 The Man Who Reclaimed His Head (1934) - Marchant
 Vanessa: Her Love Story (1935) - Amery Herries
 Naughty Marietta (1935) - Minor Role (uncredited)
 The Devil Is a Woman (1935) - Duel Conductor (uncredited)
 Werewolf of London (1935) - Sir Thomas Forsythe
 The Dark Angel (1935) - Mr. Tanner (uncredited)
 Three Kids and a Queen (1935) - Wilfred Edgar
 A Feather in Her Hat (1935) - Dr. Phillips
 A Tale of Two Cities (1935) - Prosecutor
 Klondike Annie (1936) - Sir Gilbert
 Little Lord Fauntleroy (1936) - Lord Chief Justice
 The House of a Thousand Candles (1936) - Sir Andrew McIntyre
 The Unguarded Hour (1936) - Judge (uncredited)
 The White Angel (1936) - Colonel (uncredited)
 Mary of Scotland (1936) - Judge
 Lost Horizon (1937) - First Man (uncredited)
 Under the Red Robe (1937) - Father Joseph
 Confession (1937) - Doctor (uncredited)
 S.O.S. Coast Guard (1937, Serial) - Rabinisi - Boroff's Spokesman at Screening [Ch. 1]
 The Prisoner of Zenda (1937) - Marshal Strakencz (uncredited)
 Bluebeard's Eighth Wife (1938) - Professor Urganzeff
 Invisible Enemy (1938) - Foreign Diplomat (uncredited)
 The Young in Heart (1938) - Mr. Hutchins
 Marie Antoinette (1938) - Old Nobleman at Birth of Dauphin (uncredited)
 Service de Luxe (1938) - Nicolai Voroshinsky
 Son of Frankenstein (1939) - Burgomaster
 Wife, Husband and Friend (1939) - Rudolph Hertz
 The Sun Never Sets  (1939) - Second Selection Board Member (uncredited)
 Pride of the Blue Grass (1939) - Lord Shropshire
 Rulers of the Sea (1939) - Mr. Negley
 Ninotchka (1939) - General Savitsky - Duchess' Consort (uncredited)
 British Intelligence (1940) - Brigadier General (uncredited)
 Women in War (1940) - Sir Gordon, Defense Attorney
 A Dispatch from Reuters (1940) - Member of Parliament (uncredited)
 The Son of Monte Cristo (1940) - The Baron (uncredited)
 Rage in Heaven (1941) - British Consul (uncredited)
 Our Wife (1941) - Dr. Holgarth (uncredited)
 Dr. Jekyll and Mr. Hyde (1941) - Dr. Courtland
 The Ghost of Frankenstein (1942) - Mayor (uncredited)
 My Heart Belongs to Daddy (1942) - Mr. Robertson (uncredited)
 The Living Ghost (1942) - Dr. Bruhling
 G-Men vs. the Black Dragon (1943, Serial) - Sir John Brookfield (uncredited)
 Confidential Agent (1945) - Lord Fetting (final film role)

External links 

1870 births
1952 deaths
English male film actors
Actors from Bournemouth
20th-century English male actors
British expatriate male actors in the United States